Junín Department may refer to:

Junín Department, Mendoza, Argentina
Junín Department, San Luis, Argentina
Department of Junín, Peru

See also
Junín (disambiguation)

Department name disambiguation pages